The 2008 Ulster Senior Club Football Championship was the 41st staging of the annual Ulster Senior Club Football Championship which is administered by Ulster GAA. Nine GAA county boards compete for the Séamus McFerran Cup. The championship started on 19 October 2008 and concluded with the final replay on 14 December 2008.

Crossmaglen Rangers won the competition, beating Ballinderry Shamrocks in the final, after a replay. Crossmaglen therefore went on to compete in the 2009 All-Ireland Senior Club Football Championship.

Draw

Source: Hogan Stand website.

Preliminary round

Quarter-finals

Semi-finals

Final

Replay

References

External links
 Ulster GAA website

Ulster Senior Club Football Championship
Gaelic
Ulster Senior Club Football Championship